Herbys Charlys Márquez (born December 1, 1980) is a male weightlifter from Venezuela. He won a medal at several editions of the Pan American Games for his native South American country. Márquez represented Venezuela at the 2008 Summer Olympics in Beijing, PR China.

References
 

1980 births
Living people
Venezuelan male weightlifters
Olympic weightlifters of Venezuela
Weightlifters at the 2008 Summer Olympics
Weightlifters at the 2007 Pan American Games
Weightlifters at the 2011 Pan American Games
Weightlifters at the 2015 Pan American Games
Pan American Games bronze medalists for Venezuela
Pan American Games medalists in weightlifting
Medalists at the 2007 Pan American Games
Medalists at the 2011 Pan American Games
Medalists at the 2015 Pan American Games
20th-century Venezuelan people
21st-century Venezuelan people